Walter Henry Lautenbach Jr. (November 17, 1922 – September 9, 1997) was an American National Basketball Association player. He played with the Sheboygan Red Skins during the 1949-50 NBA season. He had also played in the National Basketball League for two seasons with the Oshkosh All-Stars.

He attended high school in Plymouth, Wisconsin.

References

External links
NBL stats @ basketball-References.com

1922 births
1997 deaths
American men's basketball players
Basketball players from Wisconsin
Oshkosh All-Stars players
People from Plymouth, Wisconsin
Sheboygan Red Skins players
Shooting guards
Small forwards
Undrafted National Basketball Association players
Wisconsin Badgers men's basketball players